Celypha striana is a moth of the family Tortricidae. It is the type species of its genus Celypha.

Subspecies
Subspecies include:
Celypha striana obsoletana Gibeaux, 1984
Celypha striana subcapreolana Obraztsov, 1949

Distribution
This species can be found in most of Europe and in the eastern Palearctic realm, except the far north and northern Asia.

Habitat
This species prefers open grassy habitats, rough meadows and roadsides.

Description
The wingspan is 16–22 mm. This species is very variable in color. Usually the basic color of the forewings is light ochreous, finely reticulated dark brown. In the middle of the forewings there is a strongly developed transverse darker brown band and brown markings on the outer edge. The hindwings are gray or pale brown. Julius von Kennel provides a full description.

Biology
These moths fly from late May to late September. .  The males are active by day and from dusk onwards, while females fly only from dusk. They are attracted to light. The larvae feed on the roots of dandelion (Taraxacum officinale). They pupate in a cocoon and hibernate.

Notes
The flight season refers to Belgium and The Netherlands. This may vary in other parts of the range.

References

External links
 Waarneming.nl 
 Funet
 Lepiforum
 Svenska fjärilar 

Olethreutini
Tortricidae of Europe